Frank Leo "Red" Baughman (March 14, 1878 – December 19, 1958) was an American football coach.  He was the fifth head football coach at Ottawa University in Ottawa, Kansas and he held that position for the 1911 season.  His coaching record at Ottawa was 1–3–3.

A native of Ohio, where he was born in 1878, Baughman graduated from the Ottawa University Academy in 1902. He was later a merchant and grocer in the area. He died at a hospital at Ottawa in 1958.

References

External links
 

1878 births
1958 deaths
Ottawa Braves football coaches
Ottawa University alumni